The Ox-Bow School of Art & Artists' Residency is an artists' residency program in Saugatuck, Michigan, United States, founded in 1908 by artists Frederick Fursman and Walter Marshall Clute, both of whom taught at the School of the Art Institute of Chicago.

The founding mission of Ox-Bow was to provide a community and laboratory for artistic experimentation away from the city.  The founding members of the school were inspired by their studies in French Impressionism and wanted to create a space for plein-air painting in inspiring landscapes.  Since those early years, the school curriculum has grown to include various other methods of painting, sculpture, ceramics, papermaking, glass-blowing, and weaving.

In addition to offering courses for academic credit in the summer and winter seasons, Ox-Bow offers fellowships and residencies for practicing artists of all media.

History 
In the early years, Ox-Bow was called the "Saugatuck Summer School of Painting."  In those days, classes were held at the Bandle Farm, just a mile up the Kalamazoo River from the present location of the school.  In 1914, classes moved to the Riverside Rest Hotel in the village of Saugatuck. The Riverside Rest was later known as the Ox-Bow Inn, after ox-bow-shaped bend of the Kalamazoo River.  The owners of the then Riverside Hotel, the Shriver Family had hoped that the area would be a major port for commerce along the Great Lakes.  However, after the river channel was reshaped to flow directly into Lake Michigan, the area saw a great decline in both leisure and commercial visitors.  Due to the shrinking clientele, the Shrivers agreed to lease their property to the group of artists visiting from Chicago.  That building, now dubbed "The Inn," still stands on Ox-Bow campus and serves as gallery space, offices, and dormitories for students, staff, and visiting artists.

In 1920, prominent architect and friend of the school's founding members, Thomas Eddy Tallmadge, encouraged the school to purchase the buildings and grounds to ensure its future. Tallmadge contributed a significant amount of funding towards this effort and also bought an additional hundred acres of land adjacent to the property (Tallmadge Woods). Today much of that land remains wooded and accessible via footpaths.  There are several cottages for artists situated on that extension of the property, which include The Tallmadge, the Norton, Scanlon, and the Mary K.

Mission 

"The mission of Ox-Bow, in keeping with its history, is to sustain a haven for nurturing the creative process, through instruction, example, and community [...] Ox-Bow is of and about art and nurturing of the artist.  Since its inception, one common thread runs through it; a place apart, open to the senses with the artistic freedom and permission to pursue ideas in the open landscape of wind, sand, sky, and water." 

The primary founding artists of The Saugatuck Summer School of Painting, Frederick Fursman and Walter Marshall Clute were inspired by their work in and research into European art school traditions and sought to model their school after places like the Smith Academy and Academe Julian.  They wanted to create a space where artistic learning happened in the classroom, studio, concours (critique), as well as in nature, soirées, and as a part of the experience of living in an artists' community.

School and residency
Ox-Bow School of Art & Artists' Residency offers year-round programming and classes for a range of artistic interests and levels of expertise.  The majority of the classes take place during the summer months (June–August), and are one to two weeks in length.  The Leroy Neiman Fellowship Program offers 12 students from around the country to have the opportunity to spend the entire summer at Ox-Bow. They are provided with studio space, access to facilities, visiting artists and classes. Artist and writer residencies are also offered during the summer and fall for participants to work in the studios and engage with a community of artists. 

Former executive director of Ox-Bow Jason Kalajainen remarked in a recent interview that the student body is consistently diverse. Primarily this diversity is evident in regards to degree-seeking and non-degree seeking participants, and in the range of ages and professional experience.  He stated, "We have professional artists, SAIC graduates and undergraduates, and avocational students all in the same studio.  This makes for a dynamic environment and serves everyone quite well. Classes are small--usually eight to 14 students-which ensures that the instructor can meet each individual's needs. We really encourage exploration in other media, as well [...] Throwing someone into a totally new arena is quite common at Ox-Bow." And in terms of the range of media supported and classes offered, he stated, "If there's an idea for a course or project, our goal is to support the artist in making it. If it's feasible, we try our best to help make it happen."

Ox-Bow House 
Ox-Bow House is a pilot project that began in 2022. With a vibrant community of nationally and internationally respected artists on their campus each year, Ox-Bow House seeks to extend this resource to the public through a diverse menu of programs throughout the year.  

The name Ox-Bow House acknowledges the legacy of this historic building as a place for community and celebrates the idea that the space will be a charming place to stimulate learning and exploration. This accessible location will be a welcoming space for community neighbors in western Michigan as well as summer visitors to Douglas and Saugatuck. The space will hold an exhibition hall, space for programming, and a retail environment for curated art and design objects by alumni and artists from throughout the region and beyond. In addition to artistic programming, Ox-Bow House will also be home to our administrative office and archives, the latter expected to be made available to the public for research in 2023.

Notable alumni 

 Albert Krehbiel
 Amanda Ross-Ho
 Angela Dufresne
 Aspen Mays
 Barbara Crane
 Barbara Tannenbaum
 Ben Mahmoud
 Beth Lipman
 Betsy Rupprecht
 Burr Tillstrom
 Carrie Schneider
 Christina Ramberg
 Christine Tarkowski
 Claes Oldenburg
 Corin Hewitt
 Cynthia Carlson
 Dan Gustin
 Dan Ramirez
 Dennis Adrian
 Don Baum
 Ed Paschke
 Ed Schmid
 Edgar Rupprecht
 Edith Altman
 Edward Flood
 Elijah Burgher
 Ellen Lanyon
 Ernesto Pujol
 Frances Whitehead
 Francis Chapin
 Frank Piatek
 Frederick Fursman
 Hank Adams
 Hank Feeley
 Harrell Fletcher
 Harry Bouras
 Herb Babcock
 Hesse MacGraw
 Hollis Sigler
 Irving Petlin
 Isobel MacKinnon Rupprecht
 Jack Beal
 Jack Lemon
 Jack Troy
 Jacolby Satterwhite
 James Benning
 James Hyde
 Janet Fish
 Jerry Saltz
 Jim Henson
 Joan Mitchell
 John Torreano
 John Warner Norton
 Josh Faught
 Joshua Kind
 Joyce Kozloff
 Julie Ault
 Karen Willenbrink-Johnsen
 Karl Wirsum
 Katrin Sigurdardottir
 Keith Achepohl
 Kevin Appel
 Laylah Ali
 Lee Walton
 Leif Brush
 Lenore Tawney
 Leon Golub
 LeRoy Neiman
 Leslie Bostrom
 Marcia Tucker
 Margo Hoff
 Mark Dion
 Mark Pascale
 Martha Wilson
 Martyl
 Max Kahn
 Max Kozloff
 Maya Hayuk
 Melanie Schiff
 Michelle Grabner
 Miyoko Ito
 Molly Zuckerman-Hartung
 Nancy Spero
 Neil Frankel
 Nick Cave
 Norwood Viviano
 Paul Marioni
 Paula Hayes
 Paula Wilson
 Peter Agostini
 Peter Saul
 Philip Hanson
 Phyllis Bramson
 Richard Artschwager
 Richard Haas
 Richard Hunt
 Richard Rezac
 Rob Fischer
 Roger Brown
 Roland Ginzel
 Ron Gorchov
 Rudolph Pen
 Sarah Canright
 Scott Reeder
 Shannon R. Stratton
 Shinique Smith
 Sondra Freckelton
 Squeak Carnwath
 Stanley Tigerman
 Sterling Ruby
 Susanna Coffey
 Suzi Gablik
 Ted Halkin
 Temporary Services
 Terry Myers
 Theaster Gates
 Thomas Burckhardt
 Thomas Eddy Tallmadge
 Thomas Lawson
 Tim Barrett
 Tucker Nichols
 Tyson Reeder
 Vera Berdich
 William O'Brien
 William Olendorf
 William Weege
 Willie Cole
 Yutaka Sone
 Minoosh Zomorodinia

External links

References

Artist colonies
American art